Cloudinary is a SaaS technology company headquartered in Santa Clara, California, with offices in Israel, England, Poland, and Singapore. The company provides cloud-based image and video management services. It enables users to upload, store, manage, manipulate, and deliver images and video for websites and apps. Cloudinary is used by 1 million web and mobile application developers at more than 8,000 companies including Condé Nast, Dropbox, Forbes, Outbrain, Taboola and Answers.com. Inc. Magazine has called Cloudinary the "gold standard" of image management on the web.

History 
Cloudinary was founded in 2011 in Israel by Itai Lahan (CEO), Tal Lev-Ami (CTO), and Nadav Soferman (CPO). Cloudinary grew organically, building a profitable SaaS service, without venture capital funding. In 2015, the company received a strategic investment from Bessemer Venture Partners (BVP), which was BVP's 100th investment in cloud companies.

In 2014, Cloudinary announced fully integrated image processing add-ons leveraging technologies by Imagga, URL2PNG, Aspose, WebPurify and others. In 2015, Cloudinary opened its U.S. headquarters in Palo Alto, California, and added video management to its services. In 2019, the company moved to Santa Clara, California, and launched tools for responsive breakpoint generation. Cloudinary was named among Forbes' The Cloud 100 Rising Stars 2019.

On 7 April 2020, Cloudinary launched its upgraded WordPress plug-in for streamlined picture and video processing, and revealed its designation as a WordPress VIP Platform Partner, a select group of partners evaluated for consistency, protection, ease of use and size.

References 

Software companies based in California
Companies established in 2011
Companies based in Santa Clara, California
Software companies of the United States
Santa Clara, California
2011 establishments in the United States
2011 establishments in California
Software companies established in 2011